Emerson Oronte (born January 29, 1990) is an American cyclist, who currently rides for UCI ProTeam .

Career
Oronte worked as a domestique while on the team before leaving at the end of the 2013 season. In 2014, Oronte raced with the now defunct Horizon Organic Elite Cycling team. He scored several big results, finishing 4th overall at the Joe Martin Stage Race and going on to win the Amateur Road Nationals later that year. Going into 2015, Oronte found himself again without a professional contract, despite his results. At Rally, Oronte has proven himself a reliable domestique in the mountains, as well as a good all-round racer when he gets his own chances. Oronte has shown consistency in many types of races all across the globe and continues to be a valuable asset to Rally Cycling.

Personal life
Oronte lives and trains just outside of Boulder, Colorado. He is married to former Division 1 cyclist, Kristen Metherd.

Major results
2015
 1st Overall San Dimas Stage Race
1st Stage 1
 2nd Mount Evans Hill Climb
 10th Overall Tour of the Gila
2017
 3rd Overall Redlands Bicycle Classic
 9th Winston Salem Cycling Classic

References

External links

1990 births
Living people
American male cyclists
Cyclists from California